The 2005 Mercedes Cup was a men's tennis tournament played on outdoor clay courts. It was the 28th edition of the Mercedes Cup, and was part of the ATP International Series Gold of the 2005 ATP Tour. It was held at the Tennis Club Weissenhof in Stuttgart, Germany, from 18 July until 24 July 2005. Rafael Nadal won the singles title.

Finals

Singles

 Rafael Nadal defeated  Gastón Gaudio, 6–3, 6–3, 6–4
It was Nadal's 8th singles title of the year and 9th of his career.

Doubles

 José Acasuso /  Sebastián Prieto defeated  Mariano Hood /  Tommy Robredo 7–6(7–4), 6–3

References

External links
 Official website 
 ATP tournament profile
 ITF tournament edition details
 Singles draw
 Doubles draw

Stuttgart Open
Stuttgart Open
2005 in German tennis